Never Be the Same is the third studio album by Canadian country music artist Victoria Banks. It was released on April 26, 2011 by On Ramp Records/EMI Canada. Banks co-wrote the first single, "Come On," with The JaneDear Girls. "Remember That" was previously recorded by Jessica Simpson on her 2008 album Do You Know.

Track listing

References

2011 albums
Victoria Banks albums